This is a list of Wehrmacht and Waffen-SS divisions that committed war crimes in Italy during World War II. War crimes by German combat divisions in Italy were committed by the Waffen-SS and the Wehrmacht, with its sub-branches, the army, Luftwaffe (air force) and Kriegsmarine (navy). Historically, the view existed that the Wehrmacht fought a clean campaign there and the atrocities and war crimes were committed only by the SS, and in the latter case predominantly by the Einsatzgruppen and concentration camp guards, not by the Waffen-SS. This view has been refuted by modern research, which found that the Wehrmacht and Waffen-SS were equally involved in war crimes.

Background
Research in 2016 funded by the German government found the number of victims of Nazi war crimes in Italy to be 22,000, double the previously estimated figure. The victims were primarily Italian civilians, sometimes in retaliation for partisan attacks under the doctrine of Bandenbekämpfung ("bandit fighting"), and Italian Jews. 

The killing of Italian civilians by front-line units of the Wehrmacht and SS has sometimes been seen as stemming from a sense of betrayal the Germans felt by the Italians signing the Armistice of Cassibile, but historians have argued that the reasons for atrocities and the brutal behaviour were more complex, often resulting from the military crisis caused by the German retreats and the fear of ambushes.

Only very few soldiers of German divisions accused of war crimes ever stood trial and even fewer served time in jail after their conviction. Notable exceptions include Eduard Crasemann, commander of the 26th Panzer Division, which was involved in the Padule di Fucecchio massacre, and who was found guilty of war crimes by an Allied military tribunal and sentenced to 10 years imprisonment, dying in jail in 1950, and Walter Reder, sentenced to life in prison by an Italian military court for his role in the Marzabotto massacre as the commander of the SS-Panzer-Aufklärungsabteilung 16 of the 16th SS Panzergrenadier Division Reichsführer-SS, who was released in 1985.

The 1st Fallschirm-Panzer Division Hermann Göring and 16th SS Panzergrenadier Division Reichsführer-SS were disproportionally involved in massacres of the civilian population during the war in Italy, the two divisions accounting for approximately one third of all civilians killed in war crimes in the country.

List
Wehrmacht and Waffen-SS divisions that committed war crimes in Italy:

Notes

References

Bibliography

External links
 Atlas of Nazi and Fascist Massacres in Italy

The Holocaust in Italy
Kingdom of Italy (1861–1946)
Italian Social Republic
Nazi war crimes in Italy
War crimes
War crimes